Mark Weir Rushmere (born 7 January 1965) is a former South African cricketer who played one Test match and four One Day Internationals (ODIs) for South Africa in 1992.

Rushmere was a right-handed batsman who played for Eastern Province and Transvaal in South African domestic cricket. He played in South Africa's first World Cup in 1992 and also played in South Africa's first post-isolation Test, against the West Indies at Bridgetown, Barbados later in the same year.

Rushmere's father Colin was an all-rounder for Eastern Province and Western Province in the 1950s and 1960s.

External links

1965 births
Living people
South African cricketers
Eastern Province cricketers
Gauteng cricketers
South Africa One Day International cricketers
South Africa Test cricketers
Cricketers from Port Elizabeth
South African people of British descent
Cricketers at the 1992 Cricket World Cup
White South African people